Vodafone Arena may refer to:

 John Cain Arena, in Melbourne, Australia, known as Vodafone Arena 2000–2008
 Vodafone Arena (Fiji), in Suva, constructed for the 2003 South Pacific Games 
 Vodafone Park, in the Beşiktaş district of Istanbul, Turkey, known as Vodafone Arena 2016–2017
 NKT Arena Karlskrona, Sweden, formerly known as Vodafone Arena